The western Carolinas refers to:

Western North Carolina
Upstate South Carolina